The Mayor of North Shore City was the head of the municipal government of North Shore City, New Zealand, from 1989 to 2010, and presided over the North Shore City Council with 15 councillors. The mayor was directly elected using a first-past-the-post electoral system. The councillors were elected from three wards: Northern, Harbour and Central. The elections were held every three years.

The last serving mayor, elected in 2007, was Andrew Williams. North Shore City Council ceased to exist on 31 October 2010 and was incorporated into the Auckland Council, for which elections were held on 9 October 2010.

History
The city was established in 1989 following the amalgamation of the city of Takapuna and the boroughs of Birkenhead, East Coast Bays, Devonport and Northcote. It was abolished on 31 October 2010.

List of mayors
The following persons served as mayor of North Shore City:

References

 
North Shore